This is a list of hereditary peers elected to serve in the House of Lords under the provisions of the House of Lords Act 1999 and the Standing Orders of the House of Lords. The Act excluded all hereditary peers who were not also life peers except for two holders of royal offices plus ninety other peers, to be chosen by the House.

Before the enactment of the Act, the House approved a Standing Order stating that the remaining hereditary peers shall consist of:

 2 peers to be elected by the Labour hereditary peers
 42 peers to be elected by the Conservative hereditary peers
 3 peers to be elected by the Liberal Democrat hereditary peers
 28 peers to be elected by the Crossbencher hereditary peers
 15 peers to be elected by the whole House
 The holders of the offices of Earl Marshal (the Duke of Norfolk) and Lord Great Chamberlain (currently the Baron Carrington) to be ex officio members

The total number and sub-composition set out above reflects a compromise to ensure passage of the Act through the House reached between then-Prime Minister Tony Blair and the leader of the opposition Conservatives in the Lords, Viscount Cranborne (known since his father's death in 2003 as the Marquess of Salisbury), a descendant of the last Prime Minister to sit in the Lords throughout the entirety of their premiership. The number elected by each group reflected the relative strengths of the parties among hereditary peers at that time. Historically, the Conservatives had predominated in the House since 1890; it was this entrenched position which led to the removal of the absolute power of veto from the House of Lords by the Parliament Act 1911 and was the chief catalyst for the removal of most peers in 1999. The House of Lords Act 1999 reduced the proportion of Conservative peers in the House from 41% (in April 1999) to 33% (in June 2000), and the proportion of hereditary peers in the House from 59% to 13%.

The fifteen peers elected by the whole house were intended to provide a group of experienced members ready to serve as Deputy Speakers or other officers.

The initial elections took place before the House of Lords Act took effect; therefore all hereditary peers could vote in those elections. From the end of the 1998–1999 session of parliament until the following session, vacancies (usually triggered by death) were to be filled by runners up in the initial elections. Two Crossbench peers, Lord Cobbold and Lord Chorley, returned to the House this way, having sat before 1999. Since then, vacancies among the group of 15 peers have been filled through by-elections, with all members of the House entitled to vote. The Procedure Committee has recommended that any peer elected at a by-election in this category should not be expected to serve as a Deputy Speaker. In by-elections to fill vacancies in the political groups, only hereditary peers of that group sitting in the House may vote.

As of November 2022, there are 4 dukes, 25 earls, 15 viscounts, 45 barons and 2 Lords of Parliament among the 91 hereditary peers entitled to sit in the House of Lords. After the death of Queen Elizabeth II in 2022, the Marquess of Cholmondeley’s service as Lord Great Chamberlain came to an end; his successor was Lord Carrington, who was already an elected hereditary peer. No by-election to fill a 92nd place for hereditary peers has been called.

Only those with titles in the Peerages of England, Scotland, Great Britain and the United Kingdom are currently eligible for a seat. Peers in the Peerage of Ireland are only eligible if they hold a title in one of the other peerages, but if elected, they may use their Irish peerage whilst in the Lords; for instance, the present Earl of Arran, whose highest title is an Irish one, is entitled to a seat as Lord Sudley, his subsidiary title in the UK peerage, but sits using his highest, Irish, title.

Elected by the whole House

Sitting

Deceased

Resigned

Elected by the Conservative hereditary peers

Sitting

Deceased

Resigned

Removed for non-attendance
Pursuant to section 2 of House of Lords Reform Act 2014

Elected by the Crossbencher hereditary peers

Sitting

Deceased

Resigned

Removed for non-attendance

Pursuant to section 2 of House of Lords Reform Act 2014

Elected by the Liberal Democrats hereditary peers

Sitting

Deceased

Elected by the Labour hereditary peers

Sitting

Deceased

Notes

See also
1999 hereditary peers' elections
By-elections to the House of Lords
List of hereditary peers in the House of Lords by virtue of a life peerage
List of hereditary peers removed under the House of Lords Act 1999
Peerage of the United Kingdom
Hereditary peerage

References

Excepted hereditary peers
Hereditary peers
Elected hereditary peers